The Young Masters are a comic book supervillain team created by Paul Cornell and Mark Brooks. The team first appeared in Dark Reign: Young Avengers #1 (May 2009) as the analog to the Young Avengers.

Publication history

Dark Reign: Young Avengers is a limited series written by Paul Cornell, with artist Mark Brooks, which introduces a new group of powered teens calling themselves the Young Masters, but controlled by Norman Osborn. The new team is a twisted version of the Young Avengers, much like the Dark Avengers are to the original Avengers.

Fictional team biography
Originally assembled by Coat of Arms as an examination of superheroism art project during the Dark Reign storyline, the group was largely motivated by Melter's desire to be real heroes, but hindered significantly by unclear and conflicting ideals including Executioner's Punisher-style ruthlessness, Big Zero's racism and violent tendencies, Egghead's psychopathy and hedonism, and Coat of Arm's distorted view of ethics. Only Melter and Enchantress showed much interest in actual altruistic heroism. The team began calling themselves the "Young Avengers," but were only active as superheroes a short time before being confronted by the actual Young Avengers. The Young Avengers fought their darker counterparts where they vetted each member. Although Enchantress was a possible candidate for the original Young Avengers, she was rejected due to having a history with Loki. Displeased with the Young Avengers' decision, the team decided to become the Young Masters. Executioner contacts Norman Osborn to gain his support and the backing of the Dark Avengers. When the Young Avengers return to their headquarters, the Dark Avengers arrive. The Young Masters aid the Young Avengers in fighting the Dark Avengers. After the Dark Avengers are repelled, the Young Masters leave.

Following the "Siege of Asgard" storyline and the beginning of the Heroic Age storyline, the Young Masters lay low following Osborn's defeat. They are compromised when Enchantress becomes weak and ill in the wake of Loki's death.

The Young Masters return with Executioner and Egghead, joined by new recruits Mako, Radioactive Kid, and a female Black Knight in a plot to target older villains for assassination. It is later revealed that they had a mysterious benefactor, the villain Zodiac. No explanation is given for the absence of the other founding members of the group, but at the conclusion of the storyline, Zodiac reveals that he only needed one of them to join him, and he selects Egghead.

Big Zero, Enchantress, and Coat of Arms are later employed by Jeremy Briggs. They battle the students of the Avengers Academy in order to allow Briggs to complete his goal of depowering all of Earth's superhumans and giving their powers to people who are worthy of receiving them.

In Avengers Undercover, Black Knight, Coat of Arms, Egghead, Executioner, Mako, and Melter appear as members of the Shadow Council's incarnation of the Masters of Evil. The Young Masters make their headquarters in Constrictor's Snakepit in Bagalia. During this time, Excavator, Snot, and Mudbug are shown to have joined up with the Young Masters. During the time when Constrictor had sent Chase Stein and Deathlocket to A.I.M. Island, Enchantress and Radioactive Kid are shown to be in the company of the Young Masters. At the close of the series, Alex Wilder joins the Young Masters.

Members
Original members:
 Melter – A superhuman who can cause objects to melt. His real name is Chris Colchiss and he is the team leader.
 Enchantress – She claims to be an Asgardian and is Melter's girlfriend where she uses magic. Her real name is Sylvie Lushton.
 Executioner – A vigilante with no superpowers. He is the son of Princess Python.
 Big Zero – A Neo-Nazi who can alter her size and is in a relationship with Egghead. Her real name is Amity Hunter.
 Coat of Arms – A swordswoman whose magic coat grants her six arms.
 Egghead – A robot who wants to understand humanity.

Later recruits:
 Alex Wilder - A former member of the Runaways who was resurrected by Daimon Hellstrom.
 Black Knight - A female incarnation of the Black Knight. She deserted the Young Masters, but later returned to the group.
 Death Locket - Rebecca Ryker is the daughter of a brilliant cyberneticist who saved her life after an explosion by merging her with Deathlok technology. Survivor of Murder World/Avenger's Arena.
 Excavator - The teenage son of Piledriver and a temporary member of the Wrecking Crew. Excavator wielded an enchanted shovel. He later appeared as a member of the Young Masters in the pages of Avengers Undercover.
 Mako - A test tube Atlantean who was grown from the cells of Attuma, Orka, Tyrak, and U-Man. Mako was killed by Lady Bullseye. He later turned up alive in the pages of Avengers Undercover.
 Mudbug - A mutant with a crayfish physiology who was a former student of the Hellfire Club's Hellfire Academy. He later appeared as a member of the Young Masters in the pages of Avengers Undercover.
 Radioactive Kid - A young criminal in a hazmat suit has demonstrated the ability to melt and mutate human flesh with a touch. His very flesh glows and his eyes glow visibly through the visor of his suit.
 Snot - A former student of Hellfire Academy. He can propel large amounts of snot from his nose.

References

External links

 Young Masters at Marvel Wiki
 Young Masters at Comic Vine

2005 comics debuts
Avengers (comics) titles
Marvel Next
Harvey Award winners for Best New Series
Marvel Comics supervillain teams

es:Jóvenes Vengadores
fr:Young Avengers
it:Giovani Vendicatori
hu:Young Avengers
pt:Jovens Vingadores